Benjamin Sachs may refer to:

 Benjamin I. Sachs (born 1971), professor in the field of labor law and labor relations
 Benjamin P. Sachs, American physician